Rajapur is an upazila (sub-district) of southern Bangladesh's Jhalokati District, part of the Barisal Division.

Geography 
It has 28,131 households and a total area of 164.33 km2.

History

The current Rajapur Upazila is home to many archeological sites such as forts and mosques. The Indrapasha Qila was thought to have been constructed during the reign of the Mughal emperor Aurangzeb in the late seventeenth century. It was a fort built to suppress the Maghs and Portuguese pirates around the Bay of Bengal. In 1664, Shaista Khan was appointed as the Mughal governor of Bengal to defeat the pirates. Khan constructed many forts with his accomplice, Muhammad Azam, including the Indrapasha Qila. The Qila no longer stands, existing only as a soil mound. In the same period, Keshwar Singh, who is thought to have been a Mughal general, constructed the triple mosques of Angaria Khan Bari. A triple mosque was also constructed in the Niz Galua Mia Bari which also remains as one of the archeological tourist attractions of Rajapur.

During the Muslim rule, southern Chandradwip (including Rajapur) was governed by two sardars, one of whom was Reza Khan. The area was named Rezapur, which later became corrupted to Rajapur. In 1716, Mahmud Jan Akhand (Mamuji) established the Galua Paka Mosque in Durgapur village. Rajapur was also home to a zamindar family in Saturia descended from Khan Jahan Ali's disciple Shaykh Ahmad Sajenda. Sajenda's descendant Sheikh Shahabuddin (1626-1745) assisted the widow of Pran Narayan, the zamindar of Rayerkathi, in restoring their zamindari privileges by visiting the court of the Nawabs of Bengal in Murshidabad. Pran Narayan's heir Mahendra Narayan successively became the next zamindar of Rayerkathi, and as a reward, his mother gifted Sheikh Shahabuddin with a taluk in Saturia. Sheikh Shahabuddin founded the historic Shuktagarh Mosque, and is buried in a mazar (mausoleum) in close proximity to it. The Khanom Manzil in Barisal city was established by Mehrunnisa Khanom, who was the female zamindar of Sultanabad Pargana in present-day Rajapur along with Syed Abdullah Chowdhury. A police outpost was founded in Rajapur by the British Raj in 1920, which was established as a thana (police station) in 1937.

In 1940, the Rajapur Fazil Madrasa was established. During the Bangladesh Liberation War of 1971, a brawl took place between the Bengali freedom fighters against the Pakistan Army on 21 October at the Rajapur thana (police station compound). In the aftermath, 8 Pakistan Army soldiers and 3 freedom fighters were killed. The freedom fighters raided the thana on 27 November, gaining control and thus liberating Rajapur. Dilwar Husayn of Gopalpur village was appointed as a sub-sector commander for Dinajpur under Sector 6 and later awarded Bir Protik. Alamtaj Begum Sabi was a notable female freedom fighter of Rajapur. The status of Rajapur Thana was upgraded to upazila (sub-district) in 1983 as part of the President of Bangladesh Hussain Muhammad Ershad's decentralisation programme.

Demographics
According to the 1991 Bangladesh census, Rajapur had a population of 143,659. Males constituted 49.93% of the population, and females 50.07%. The population aged 18 or over was 72,392. Rajapur had an average literacy rate of 52.7% (7+ years), compared to the national average of 32.4%.

Administration
Rajapur Upazila is divided into six union parishads: Baraia, Galua, Mathbari, Rajapur, Saturia, and Suktagarh. The union parishads are subdivided into 72 mauzas and 75 villages.

Chairmen

Notable people

A. K. Fazlul Huq, first and longest-serving Prime Minister of Bengal
Abdul Auwal Khan, educationist
Sultan Hossain Khan, former chairperson of the Anti-Corruption Commission and Bangladesh Press Council
Shahjahan Omar, retired army major and former minister
Harun ar-Rashid, agricultural researcher

See also
 Upazilas of Bangladesh
 Districts of Bangladesh
 Divisions of Bangladesh

References 

Upazilas of Jhalokati District